Vule may refer to:

People with the name
Vule Avdalović, Serbian basketball coach
Vule Ilić, Serbian military commander
Vule Trivunović, Bosnian football manager

Other uses
Vule Airways, Ugandan private airline

See also